Fort Louis may refer to several historic French settlements including:

 Fort Louis (La Rochelle), built by Louis XIII in 1620. 
 Fort Louis (Pondicherry), French fort in Pondicherry, destroyed in 1761.
 Fort Louis, Senegal, a major French trading post on the Senegal River in West Africa.
 Fort Louis de La Louisiane, the name of Mobile, Alabama before 1712.
 Fort Louisbourg, the historic site of Louisbourg, Nova Scotia.
 Fort Louis (fortress), the Rhine fortress around which developed the commune of Fort-Louis, Bas-Rhin
 Fort-Louis, a commune in the Bas-Rhin department, France
 Fort Louis military camp, Kansas (during World War I)